Lonwolwol, Raljago, or West Ambrym, is an Oceanic language of Ambrym Island, Vanuatu with fewer than 100 speakers.

References

External links
Database of audio recordings in Lonwolwol (Craig Cove) - basic Catholic prayers
Materials on Lonwolwol are included in the open access Arthur Capell collections (AC1 and AC2) held by Paradisec.

Paama–Ambrym languages
Languages of Vanuatu